Goodbye is the fifth album by the American band The Czars, released in November 2004 on the Bella Union label. It was The Czars' last studio album of original material and was  favourably reviewed by The Guardian, Mojo, Q, Uncut,  AllMusic,  and Pitchfork.

Track listing

Personnel
John Grant – Lead vocals, piano, synthesisers
Andy Monley - Guitars
Roger Green – Guitar, synthesisers
Chris Pearson - Bass
Jeff Linsenmaier - Drums

References

2005 albums
John Grant (musician) albums
Bella Union albums